Urmia Plain is a region in the West Azerbaijan Province of Iran. It lies between Lake Urmia to the east, and the Turkish border to the west. It contains the city of Urmia.

The inhabitants of the Urmia Plain are Azerbaijani people and Kurds with a minority of Assyrian and Armenians.

See also
 Nineveh Plains

References

Plains of Iran
Landforms of West Azerbaijan Province
Assyrian geography